The Grimethorpe Colliery Band is a brass band, based in Grimethorpe, South Yorkshire, England. It was formed in 1917, as a leisure activity for the workers at the colliery, by members of the disbanded Cudworth Colliery Band. Along with the Black Dyke Mills Band, the band became the first to perform at the Proms. Grimethorpe Band achieved worldwide fame after appearing in the film Brassed Off.

History
The year after the band's formation saw it enter its first competition at Belle Vue in Manchester. Its first radio broadcast was in 1932 and from 1941 to 1951 it was on UK national radio every month.

George Thompson was musical director from the early 1950s until 1972 during which time the band won the British Open Contest for the first time. Thompson was followed by Elgar Howarth as Professional Conductor and Musical Director. 1974 saw the band, along with Black Dyke Mills Band, become the first to perform at the Proms.

The band continued through the industrial troubles of the 1980s and the closure of Grimethorpe Colliery on 13 October 1992. The band gained first place with 99 out of 100 on 17 October 1992 in the National Brass Band Championship at the Royal Albert Hall in London.

Following the closure of the Grimethorpe Colliery in 1993, the Band was sponsored by RJB Mining (later UK Coal plc) and then by Powerfuel.

Premieres
The Grimethorpe Colliery Band has premiered some of the most important brass music of the 20th century, including Sir Harrison Birtwistle's Grimethorpe Aria, written for the band, and Hans Werner Henze's Ragtimes and Habaneras as well as several pieces by Sir Malcolm Arnold.

Rock and pop
The band has appeared on rock and pop records, notably "When an Old Cricketer Leaves the Crease", on Roy Harper's 1975 HQ album, and Peter Skellern's 1978 and 1979 albums Skellern (including the hit single "Love Is the Sweetest Thing") and Astaire. In 1976, the band assisted comedian Max Bygraves in recording a song specially commissioned by the National Coal Board called "Do It The Safety Way", in order to promote safety procedures in coalmines.

One former member of the band, trombonist Andy Cato, went on to co-found electronic music duo Groove Armada.

In films
International fame came with the film Brassed Off, the plot of which was based on Grimethorpe's struggles against pit closures, and whose soundtrack was recorded by the band. The band also performed Ron Goodwin's film score for the 1976 Disney film Escape from the Dark (also called The Littlest Horse Thieves), with the composer conducting.

Honours
 National Brass Band Championships – Winners 1970, 1992, 2006 and 2007.
 English National Brass Band Championships – Winners 2007, 2008.
 Yorkshire Champions – 1963, 1967, 1973, 1983, 1991, 1995, 2005, 2006.
 Brass in Concert Champions – 1977, 1979, 1980, 1981, 1983, 1986, 1993, 1994, 1999, 2001 to 2005, 2010 and 2014.
 Mineworkers' Champions – 1967, 1968, 1969, 1973 to 1980, 1983, 1985 to 2002.
 British Open Champions – 1969, 1984, 1991, 2015.
 Granada Band of the Year – 1972, 1973, 1976, 1977, 1981, 1985.

Other events
The band represented England at the European Brass Band Championship in Norway in May 2008 and came second behind the Cory Band, both on 194 points. In June 2008 Grimethorpe gained its second successive victory at the English National Brass Band Championships, thus qualifying to represent England once again at the European Championships in Ostende, Belgium, in 2009. The band gained further worldwide attention with its rendition of the Olympic Hymn during the 2012 Summer Olympics Opening Ceremony in the Olympic Stadium, accompanied by the London Symphony Orchestra.

Notable members

 Roger Webster – Former Principal Cornet
 Nicholas Childs – Former Solo Euphonium
 Andy Cato – Former Trombonist and co-founder of electronic music duo Groove Armada.

Partial discography

References

External links
 Official site

Video clips
 Concierto d'Aranjuez, from the film Brassed Off
 MacArthur Park, played at Brass in Concert 2008 at The Sage
 Grimethorpe Aria, composed for the band by Sir Harrison Birtwistle
 The New Jerusalem, winning performance at the 1992 National Championships at the Royal Albert Hall
 Eurovision interval show, performing at the Eurovision Song Contest 1998

1917 establishments in England
Metropolitan Borough of Barnsley
Grimethorpe
Grimethorpe
Mining in South Yorkshire
Music in South Yorkshire
Grimethorpe
Grimethorpe
Grimethorpe
People from Grimethorpe